The Gazzetta Sports Awards and the Gazzetta Referendum are surveys conducted annually by the Italian sports newspaper La Gazzetta dello Sport to reward the best sportsmen and sportswomen of the calendar year.

Winners

Italian

Worldwide

Other awards
Since 2015, other awards have been given.
Coach of the Year
 2015: Antonio Conte (association football)
 2016: Claudio Ranieri (association football)
 2017: Gian Piero Gasperini (association football)
 2018: Massimiliano Allegri (association football)
 2019: Roberto Mancini (association football)
 2020: Stefano Pioli (association football)
 2021: Antonio Conte (association football)
 2022: Ferdinando De Giorgi (volleyball)

Performance of the Year
 2015: Fabio Aru (cycling)
 2016: Niccolò Campriani (shooting)
 2017: Andrea Belotti (association football)
 2018: Mauro Icardi (association football)
 2019: Jannik Sinner (tennis)
 2020: Filippo Ganna (cycling)
 2021: Sonny Colbrelli (cycling)
 2022: Gregorio Paltrinieri (swimming)

Paralympic Athlete of the Year
 2015: Martina Caironi (paralympic athletics)
 2016: Beatrice Vio (wheelchair fencing)
 2017: Italy women's national deaf volleyball team (deaf volleyball)
 2018: Beatrice Vio (wheelchair fencing) and Oney Tapia (paralympic athletics)
 2019: Simone Barlaam (paralympic swimming)
 2020: Briantea 84 Cantù
 2021: Beatrice Vio (wheelchair fencing)
 2022: Xenia Palazzo (paralympic swimming)

Exploit of the Year
 2015: Roberta Vinci (tennis)
 2016: Gianluigi Donnarumma (association football)
 2017: Andrea Dovizioso (motorsport)
 2018: Elia Viviani (cycling)
 2019: Charles Leclerc (Formula 1)
 2020: Jannik Sinner (tennis)
 2021: Nicolò Barella (association football)

Revelation of the Year
 2018: Simona Quadarella (swimming)
 2019: Matteo Berrettini (tennis)
 2020: Enea Bastianini (motorcycle racing) and Larissa Iapichino (long jump)
 2021: Francesco Bagnaia (motorcycle racing)
 2022: Yemaneberhan Crippa (long-distance running)

Most Promising Talent of the Year
 2018: Francesco Bagnaia (motorsport)
 2019: Benedetta Pilato (swimming)

Fair Play of the Year
 2015: Valentina Diouf (volleyball)
 2016: Tamara Lunger (ski mountaineering)
 2017: Matteo Manassero (golf)

Legend
 2015: Valentino Rossi (motorsport) and Alex Zanardi (paracycling)
 2016: Federica Pellegrini (swimming) and Alberto Tomba (alpine skiing)
 2017: Francesco Totti (association football) and Alberto Contador (cycling)
 2018: Paolo Maldini (association football), Vincenzo Nibali (cycling), and Christian Vieri (association football)
 2019: Siniša Mihajlović (association football)
 2020: Zlatan Ibrahimović (association football)
 2021: Daniele De Rossi (association football)
 2022: Giacomo Agostini (motorcycle racing), Beatrice Vio (wheelchair fencing), and Vincenzo Nibali (cycling)

ESport
 2019: Daniele “Jizuke” Di Mauro

SportWeek Award
 2019: Italy women's national football team
 2020: Maxime Mbanda (rugby)
 2021: Federica Pellegrini (swimming)

Special Award
 2020: Maxime Mbanda (rugby)

Emotion of the Year
 2021: Gianmarco Tamberi (high jump)

Giro d'Italia Award
 2021: Lorenzo Fortunato (cycling)

Multiwinners

Italian

See also
 La Gazzetta dello Sport

Notes

References

External links
 Official site

Italian sports trophies and awards
Awards established in 1978
1978 establishments in Italy
Awards by magazines